Sorkhun (also Romanized as Sorkhūn) is a village in Doshman Ziari Rural District, in the Central District of Kohgiluyeh County, Kohgiluyeh and Boyer-Ahmad Province, Iran. At the 2006 census, its population was 251, in 39 families.

References 

Populated places in Kohgiluyeh County